Sir Francis N. Burton was launched in 1825 at Quebec. She made several voyages to India under a license from the EIC. She was wrecked on 16 February 1838.

Career 
Sir Francis N. Burton first appeared in Lloyd's Register (LR) in 1826 with F. Boston, master, Pickth__ (or Peckerhance), owner, and trade Liverpool–Quebec. She assumed British registry on 5 October 1827.  In 1827 Her master changed to J.White.

Captain Reed sailed from England on 17 October 1832, bound for Bombay. In 1833 the EIC gave up its maritime business. Thereafter, vessels trading between the United Kingdom and India or China no longer required a license from the EIC.

Fate 
On 16 February 1838, Sir  Francis Burton was totally lost in Ardmore Bay,, Ardmore, County Waterford, near Youghal. She was sailing from Liverpool to Demerara, now in Guyana, with a general cargo. By one report her crew were saved; by another, all 13 hands perished. Earlier, apparently the East India Company turned her down when her owners would not make necessary improvements.

Citations

References

1825 ships
Ships built in Quebec
Age of Sail merchant ships of England
Maritime incidents in February 1838